Loris Mularoni (born 31 July 1976) is a Sammarinese judoka. He competed in the men's lightweight event at the 1996 Summer Olympics.

References

1976 births
Living people
Sammarinese male judoka
Olympic judoka of San Marino
Judoka at the 1996 Summer Olympics
Place of birth missing (living people)